Murray Burt (born 15 August 1943) is a former speedway rider from New Zealand.

Speedway career 
Burt is a champion of New Zealand, winning the New Zealand Championship in 1965.

He rode in the top tier of British Speedway from 1967 until 1969, riding for various clubs.

References 

1943 births
Living people
New Zealand speedway riders
Newcastle Diamonds riders
Wimbledon Dons riders
Wolverhampton Wolves riders